Robert Butler (September 25, 1943 – March 19, 2014) was a Postwar & Contemporary Artist best known for his portrayals of the woods and backwaters around Florida's Everglades. He was a member of the well-known African-American artist's group, The Highwaymen.

Early life
Butler was born in the small timber and farming community of Baxley, Georgia, on September 25, 1943. Raised by his mother, Annie Talifer Butler, who always took time to instill the principles of faith and compassion in her family, Butler considers his upbringing as "classically American." 

In 1947, Butler moved to Okeechobee, Florida, where he later became intimately familiar with the woods and waters of the Florida Everglades, and especially Lake Okeechobee, that feature prominently in his paintings. Robert Butler's goal in his paintings was to preserve the nature around him which was easily accessible due to his location. The inspiration for the content of his paintings was drawn from those various landscapes.

His professional career began in 1968. In the early days, he often sold his paintings door-to-door or on the roadside. The term "Highwayman" which Butler helped to coin for his category of artist was given due to their method of producing paintings and then traveling along the highways of Florida to sell the paintings for a living. He honed his skills by creating upwards of one hundred paintings per year.  Despite a lack of formal training, Robert developed his own style, which was exemplified by dramatically-lit  portrayals of landscapes.

Butler was named a Knight by a member of the Royal Family of Ethiopia, namely Prince Ermias Sahle Selassie.  The Imperial Order of the Star of Honor of the Ethiopian Empire, the order to which Butler was inducted, was created to honor both domestic and foreign individuals who had given exemplary service to the Ethiopian Empire.

Death
Sometime in his 40s Butler was diagnosed with diabetes; a disease which eventually contributed to his death while living at a nursing home in Lakeland, Florida. Butler died on March 19, 2014, at the age of 70.

Bibliography 

 2014 - Highwaymen Artists, An Untold Truth

See also

 African American art

References

Notes
 Robert Butler Highwaymen Art Authentication Reseach Services

 Collection of Robert Butler paintings at Florida's Second District Court Of Appeal
 Robert Butler (20th Century) at Ask Art - The Artists' Bluebook
 Interior Landscape
 SFCC Museum of Fine Arts and Culture

External links
 RB Fine Arts
 Robert Butler Highwaymen Art Authentication Reseach Services
 illuministe du 21ème siècle, llc
 Research Robert Butler, AskArt.Com-The Artists Bluebook-Worldwide Edition!
 Highwaymen paintings lost in fire
 
 
 Video about the Highwaymen by WMFE-TV
 Robert Butler | Florida Highwaymen Paintings

American contemporary painters
Painters from Florida
Folk artists
People from Baxley, Georgia
2014 deaths
1943 births
People from Lakeland, Florida
Painters from Georgia (U.S. state)
People from Okeechobee, Florida
African-American painters
20th-century African-American people
21st-century African-American people

de:Robert Butler